Tanya Ryno is an American film and television producer, director, and writer.  She was the film segment producer/head of production for more than 100 episodes of SNL and has produced many of the commercial parodies for which the show is noted along with all the animated TV Funhouse segments. And while she was not always recognized for it, Tanya was one of very few women producing comedy sketches and animation shorts starting in the 1990's. In 2011, she won an "Inspiring Filmmaker" award from the city of Detroit for her continued contribution to helping build back the area's film and art community.

Early life
Ryno was born in Fort Lee (Virginia), at the Kenner Army Health Clinic, and is the daughter of Stephen Wayne Grondin and Donna Ruth Kitchen.  She was raised in Maine, where she attended Hampden Academy.  She later studied film and photography in New York City at the School of Visual Arts.

Career
In addition to the commercial parodies, Tanya was a producer for Robert Smigel's TV Funhouse series, including the award-winning Ambiguously Gay Duo, which was voiced by Steve Carell and Stephen Colbert, The X-Presidents, and Fun with Real Audio. She even produced the GoLords (Stop Motion) Puppet series written by Andrew Steele, which was short lived, but had a cult-like following. Tanya was also a producer for several prime time specials including The Best of Chris Farley compilation and The Best of Phil Hartman.

Ryno was a producer on New York at the Movies for A&E.  A documentary hosted by Meryl Streep that included over 14 film legends (including:  Martin Scorsese, Sidney Lumet, Spike Lee, Nora Ephron, Edward Burns, and John Turturro) giving their real-life experiences of making movies in New York City. With the tagline of  "You can't fake New York".

Ryno also produced Coney Island Baby, an award-winning romantic comedy that takes place in Sligo, Ireland and made its premiere television broadcast on the Sundance Channel.

Throughout the years, she has also worked with the ESPY's, the American Music Awards, and several commercial productions including Levi Strauss & Co., American Express, Toys R Us, microsoft, and Lincoln.  During that time, she also ventured into publishing and created the New Jersey Production Guide, New Jersey's first comprehensive resource for film production, commercial productions, and television production in the New Jersey area.

Other ventures

IRON HOUSE DESIGN
Tanya and Jim Ryno co-founded a luxury home gym design firm that caters to the rich and famous.

Selected filmography
One Particular Harbor (film)| One Particular Harbor (2009)
Coney Island Baby (2006) is a comedy-drama in which Ryno made her producing debut for a feature-length film.

Shorts / parodies
Big Tweet (music video/short) | Big Tweet (2011) | Featuring Brandon T. Jackson & Sydney Tamiia Poitier
The Support Group (short) | The Support Group  (2009)

Also see:
List of Saturday TV Funhouse segments
List of Saturday Night Live commercial parodies
NYWIFT

Awards

Publications
 Beyond the Ocean Waves 2021  Based on a true story, Tanya's real life is included in this "truth is stranger than fiction" memoir written by her good friend T. Edwards Brown.

References

External links
 Official Website at TanyaRyno.com
 
 Coney Island Baby Clip on the Sundance Channel.
 IRON HOUSE DESIGN

American television producers
American women television producers
Living people
Year of birth missing (living people)
Hampden Academy alumni
21st-century American women